Marian T. Place was an American author who wrote nonfiction, fiction and juvenile fiction books as well as essays relating to the American West. She wrote more than 40 books under her own name and several pseudonyms.

Personal life and education 
Marian Whitinger Templeton was born in 1910 in Gary, Indiana to Clarence Ray and Lillian R. Templeton. In 1931, she earned a B.S. from the University of Minnesota, followed in 1935 with a B.A. from Rollins College in Winter Park, Florida. Templeton subsequently earned her Masters of Library Science at the University of Minnesota. Shortly after completing her education, Templeton met Howard Thirloway Place while working for the Glasgow Courier and married him in 1936 in Glasgow, Montana. They went on to have two children, David and Nancy. Place and her husband moved to Portland, Oregon in 1962 where she resided until her death in 2006.

Professional life 
Place published works under her own name and two pseudonyms, Dale White and R.D. Whitinger. When writing about hunting, fishing, the Forest Service, and other science and nature related topics, Place published under Dale White, while R.D. Whitinger was used only briefly when Place dabbled with writing Westerns. She was the recipient of several awards under one of her pseudonyms and her own name, including the Mark Twain Award. Place was a prolific writer, publishing over 40 children's books in addition to magazine articles for Montana: The Magazine of Western History, and books under her pseudonyms.

Published materials 
The following list contains some of Place's writing, both magazine articles and books.

Published under Marian T. Place

 "The Kid's Corral." Montana: The Magazine of Western History, Autumn 1956, 1957.
 "The Endless Debate Rages: Historical Fictionalizing Versus Fact."  Montana: The Magazine of Western History, Spring 1955.
 The Boy Who Saw Bigfoot
 The Witch Who Saved Halloween
 On the Track of Bigfoot
 Nobody Meets Bigfoot
 Bigfoot All Over the Country
 Cariboo Gold: The Story of the British Columbia Gold Rush
 The Resident Witch
 Mount St. Helen's: A Sleeping Volcano Awakes
 The First Astrowitches
 Marcus and Narcissa Whitman: Oregon Pioneers
 The Copper Kings of Montana
 Westward on the Oregon Trail
 Gold Down Under
 Mountain Man
 Comanches and Other Indians of Texas
 The Frontiersman: The True Story of Billy Dixon
 American Cattle Trails East and West
 The Yukon

Published under Dale White

 The Singing Boones
 Is Something Up There?
 Young Deputy Smith
 Hold Back the Hunter
 The Johnny Cake McNe
 Vigilantes, Ride!
 Steamboat Up the Missouri
 Gifford Pinchot, The Man Who Saved Forests
 Bat Masterson
 Thunder in his Mo

Published under R.D. Whitinger

 High Trail
 Bitterroot Basin

Awards 
Under the pseudonym Dale White, Place was awarded the Spur Award from the Western Writers of America two times. The first was for Steamboat Up the Missouri in 1958 and the second was for Hold Back the Hunter in 1959.

Under her own name, Place received the Mark Twain Award for The Boy Who Saw Bigfoot in 1982. She also was awarded the Garden State's Children Book Award in 1977 for On the Track of Bigfoot. Place was nominated for the California Young Reader Medal for The Boy Who Saw Bigfoot in 1982–1983.

Legacy 
There are several archival collections of Marian T. Place's work, including at Montana State University's Merril G. Burlingame Archives and Special Collections, at the Arizona State University Archives, and at the University of Wyoming.

References

External links 

 Collection 095, Marian T. Place Papers, 1951-1963. Held at Montana State University's Archives and Special Collections.
 Marian T. Place Papers, 1931-1991. Held at Arizona State University Archives.
 Arizona Archives Online.
 Buckskins and Buffalo: The Story of the Yellowstone River.  Manuscript held by the University of Wyoming, American Heritage Center. 
 Mystery of the Wild Horse Trap. Held at Montana State University's Archives and Special Collections.

American children's writers
1910 births
2006 deaths
Notable residents of Montana